Tigran Yeghiayi Mansurian (born 27 January 1939) is a leading Armenian composer of classical music and film scores, People's Artist of the Armenian SSR (1990), and Honored Art Worker of the Armenian SSR (1984). He is the author of orchestral, chamber, choir and vocal works, which have been played across the world. He was nominated for Grammy awards in 2004 and 2017.

Biography
Mansurian was born in Beirut, Lebanon on January 27, 1939. His family moved to Armenia in 1947 and settled in Yerevan in 1956, where he continued his education. He studied first at the Romanos Melikian Music School under the Armenian composer Edvard Baghdasaryan and later at the Yerevan Komitas State Conservatory. During his years of study, he wrote different works of varied genres and was awarded for some of them. 

He taught modern music theory at the Conservatory from 1967 to 1986. He was the Rector of the Conservatory from 1992 to 1995. 

His "Monodia" album was nominated for the 2004 Grammy Award for "Best Instrumental Soloist(s) Performance (with Orchestra)" and "Best Classical Contemporary Composition."
He received the Presidential Award of Armenia for immortalizing the memory of the martyrs and for presenting the Armenian Genocide to the world through the album “Requiem". This was nominated in two categories, "Best Contemporary Classical Composition" and "Best Choral Performance", at the 60th annual Grammy Awards in 2017.

Recordings
Tigran Mansurian: String Quartets - Rosamunde Quartett (ECM 1905)
Tigran Mansurian: "…and then I was in time again", Lachrymae, Confessing with Faith – Kim Kashkashian, viola; Jan Garbarek, soprano saxophone; The Hilliard Ensemble; Christoph Poppen, conductor; Münchener Kammerorchester.  (CD ECM 1850/51)
Tigran Mansurian: Havik, Duet for viola and percussion – Kim Kashkashian, viola; Robyn Schulkowsky, percussion; Tigran Mansurian, piano, voice.  (CD ECM 1754)
Tigran Mansurian: Quasi parlando - Patricia Kopatchinskaja, violin; Anja Anja Lechner, violonchello; Amsterdam sinfonietta; Candida Thompson. (ECM new series 2323)

Works

Mansurian's compositions range from large scale orchestral works to individual art songs. He also composed several film scores between 1968 and 1980. In 2017, Tigran Mansurian released an album entitled Requiem, a collection of eight pieces "Dedicated to memory of the victims of the Armenian Genocide." Mansurian's film music is melody, lyricism and greatly contributes to the completion of the film's artistic description.
The composer’s works have been performed in the largest concert halls of London, Paris, Rome, Milan, Berlin, Vienna, Moscow, New York, Los Angeles, and other cities.

Stage
The Snow Queen (ballet in two acts with a scenario by Vilen Galstyan, after the story by Hans Christian Andersen), 1989

Orchestral
Concerto, for organ and small orchestra, 1964
Partita, for large orchestra, 1965
Music for Twelve Strings, 1966
Preludes, for large orchestra, 1975
To the Memory of Dmitry Shostakovich, for cello and large orchestra, 1976
Canonical Ode, for harp, organ and 2 string orchestras, 1977
Concerto No. 2, for cello and string orchestra, 1978
Double Concerto, for violin, cello and string orchestra, 1978
Tovem, for small orchestra, 1979
Nachtmusik, for large orchestra, 1980
Because I Do Not Hope (in memory of Igor Stravinsky), for small orchestra, 1981
Concerto, for violin and string orchestra, 1981
Concerto No. 3, for cello and small orchestra, 1983
Postludio Concerto, for clarinet, cello, string orchestra, 1993
Concerto, for viola and string orchestra, 1995
Fantasy, for piano and string orchestra, 2003
Concerto No. 2 (Four Serious Songs) for violin and string orchestra, 2006
Concerto No. 4 (Ubi est Abel frater tuus?) for cello and small orchestra, 2010
Romance for violin and string orchestra, 2011
Quasi parlando for cello and string orchestra, 2012

Chamber music
Sonata, for viola and piano, 1962
Sonata, for flute and piano, 1963
Sonata No. 1, for violin, piano, 1964
Allegro barbaro, for solo cello, 1964
Sonata No. 2, for violin and piano, 1965
Piano Trio, for violin, cello, and piano, 1965
Psalm, for two flutes and violin, 1966
Interior, for string quartet, 1972
Silhouette of a Bird, for harpsichord and percussion, 1971–73
Sonata No. 1, for cello and piano, 1973
Sonata No. 2, for cello and piano, 1974
Wind Quintet, for flute, oboe, clarinet, French horn, and bassoon, 1974
The Rhetorician, for flute, violin, double bass, and harpsichord, 1978
Capriccio, for solo cello, 1981
String Quartet No. 1, 1983–84
String Quartet No. 2, 1984
Five Bagatelles, for violin, cello, and piano, 1985
Tombeau, for cello and percussion, 1988
Postludio, for clarinet and cello, 1991-92 (also has a concerto version)
String Quartet No. 3, 1993
Concerto, for English horn, clarinets, bassoons, trumpets, and trombones, 1995
Hommage à Anna Akhmatova, for bass clarinet, qanun (zither), viola, and marimba, 1997
Duo, for viola and percussion, 1998
Dance, for viola and percussion, 1998
Lacrimae, for soprano saxophone and viola, 1999;
Lamento, for violin, 2002 (also has version for viola)
Three Medieval Taghs, for viola and percussion, 1998–2004
Testament, for string quartet, 2004
Ode an den Lotus (Ode to the Lotus) for viola solo, 2012

Piano
Sonatina No. 1, 1963
Petite Suite, 1963
Sonata No. 1, 1967
Miniatures, 1969
Three Pieces, 1970–71
Nostalgia, 1976
Three Pieces for the Low Keys, 1979
Sonatina No. 2, 1987

Choral
Three Poems, for mixed chorus, 1969 (text by Kostan Zaryan)
Spring Songs, for mixed chorus, 1996 (text by Hovhannes Tumanyan),
Confessing with Faith, for four male voices and viola, 1998 (text by Nerses Shnorhali)
Ars Poetica concerto for mixed chorus, 1996–2000 (text by Yeghishe Charents)
Motet, two mixed choruses, 2000 (text by Grigor Narekatsi),
On the Shores of Eternity, for mixed chorus, 2003 (text by Avetik Isahakyan)

Vocal
Three Romances, for mezzo-soprano and piano, 1966 (text by Federico García Lorca, translated into Armenian by Hamo Sahyan)
Four Hayrens  for mezzo-soprano (or viola) and piano, 1967 (text by Nahapet Kuchak)
Intermezzo, for soprano and ensemble, 1972-73 (text by Vladimir Holan), score lost)
I am Giving You a Rose, for soprano, flute, cello, and piano, 1974 (text by Matevos Zarifyan)
Three Nairian Songs, for baritone and large orchestra, 1975–76 (text by Vahan Teryan)
Three Madrigals, for soprano, flute, cello, piano, 1974–81 (text by Razmik Davoyan),
Sunset Songs, for soprano and piano, 1984–85 (a song-cycle to text by Hamo Sahyan)
The Land of Nairi for soprano and piano, 1986 (a song-cycle to text by Vahan Teryan),
Miserere, for soprano and string orchestra, 1989 (texts by Saint Mesrob based on the Bible in Armenian translation)
Madrigal IV, for soprano, flute, clarinet, violin, cello, piano, and tubular bells, 1991 (text by Alicia Kirakosyan)
Requiem, for soprano, baritone, mixed chorus and string orchestra, 2011

Film scores
The Color of Pomegranates, 1968 (directed by Sergei Parajanov)
The Color of Armenian Land, 1968 (directed by Mikhail Vartanov)
Autumn Pastoral, 1971 (directed by Mikhail Vartanov)
And So Every Day, 1972 (directed by Mikhail Vartanov)
We and Our Mountains, 1969 (directed by Henrik Malyan)
Seasons of the Year, 1975 (directed by Artavazd Peleshyan)
Autumn Sun, 1979 (directed by Bagrat Oganesyan)
Legend of the Clown, 1979 (directed by Levon Asatryan)
A Piece of Sky, 1980 (directed by Henrik Malyan)
The Tango of Our Childhood, 1984 (directed by Albert Mkrtchyan)

References

External links
Tigran Mansurian - Armenian National Music
Tigran Mansurian on Other Minds Festival website
Tigran Mansurian-Confessing With Music Documentary Film

1939 births
Living people
Komitas State Conservatory of Yerevan alumni
Armenian composers
20th-century classical composers
21st-century classical composers
Armenian musicians
Musicians from Beirut
Lebanese people of Armenian descent
Male classical composers
20th-century male musicians
21st-century male musicians